This page details the all-time statistics, records, and other achievements pertaining to the Miami Heat. The Miami Heat is an American professional basketball team currently playing in the National Basketball Association.

Franchise accomplishments and awards

Individual awards

NBA Most Valuable Player
 LeBron James – 2012, 2013

NBA Finals MVP
 Dwyane Wade – 2006
 LeBron James – 2012, 2013

NBA All-Star Game MVP
 Dwyane Wade – 2010

NBA Scoring Champion
 Dwyane Wade – 2009

NBA Defensive Player of the Year
 Alonzo Mourning – 1999, 2000

NBA Most Improved Player Award
 Rony Seikaly – 1990
 Isaac Austin – 1997

NBA Sixth Man of the Year
 Tyler Herro – 2022

Best NBA Player ESPY Award
 Dwyane Wade – 2006
 LeBron James - 2012

NBA Coach of the Year
 Pat Riley – 1997

NBA Executive of the Year
 Pat Riley – 2011

J. Walter Kennedy Citizenship Award
 P. J. Brown – 1997
 Alonzo Mourning – 2002

All-NBA First Team
 Dwyane Wade – 2009, 2010
 Shaquille O'Neal – 2005, 2006
 LeBron James – 2011–2014
 Alonzo Mourning – 1999
 Tim Hardaway – 1997

All-NBA Second Team
 Dwyane Wade – 2005, 2006, 2011
 Tim Hardaway – 1998, 1999
 Alonzo Mourning – 2000

All-NBA Third Team
 Dwyane Wade – 2007, 2012, 2013
 Jimmy Butler – 2020, 2021

NBA All-Defensive First Team
 Alonzo Mourning – 1999, 2000
 LeBron James – 2011, 2012, 2013

NBA All-Defensive Second Team
 P.J. Brown – 1997, 1999
 Bruce Bowen – 2001
 Dwyane Wade – 2005, 2009, 2010
 LeBron James – 2014
 Hassan Whiteside – 2016
 Bam Adebayo – 2020, 2021
 Jimmy Butler – 2021

NBA All-Rookie First Team
 Sherman Douglas – 1990
 Steve Smith – 1992
 Caron Butler – 2003
 Dwyane Wade – 2004
 Michael Beasley – 2009
 Kendrick Nunn – 2020

NBA All-Rookie Second Team
 Kevin Edwards – 1989
 Glen Rice – 1990
 Willie Burton – 1991
 Udonis Haslem – 2004
 Mario Chalmers – 2009
 Justise Winslow– 2016
 Tyler Herro – 2020

NBA All-Star Weekend

NBA All-Star Weekend Game MVP
 Dwyane Wade - 2010
NBA All-Star Skills Challenge Champion
 Dwyane Wade – 2006, 2007
 Bam Adebayo – 2020

NBA All-Star Three-point Shootout Champion
 Glen Rice – 1995
 Jason Kapono – 2007
 Daequan Cook – 2009
 James Jones – 2011

NBA All-Star Slam Dunk Contest Champion
 Harold Miner – 1993, 1995
 Derrick Jones Jr. – 2020

NBA All-Star selections
 Alonzo Mourning – 1996, 1997, 2000, 2001, 2002
 Tim Hardaway – 1997, 1998
 Anthony Mason – 2001
 Shaquille O'Neal – 2005, 2006, 2007
 Dwyane Wade – 2005–2016, 2019
 LeBron James – 2011–2014
 Chris Bosh – 2011–2016
 Goran Dragic – 2018
 Jimmy Butler – 2020, 2022
 Bam Adebayo – 2020
 Stan Van Gundy – 2005 (as Head Coach)
 Erik Spoelstra - 2013 (as Head Coach)

Franchise records for regular season
Most points scored in a game
 LeBron James – 61
 Glen Rice – 56
 Dwyane Wade – 55
 LeBron James – 51
 Dwyane Wade – 50

Highest points per game in a season
 Dwyane Wade – 30.2
 Dwyane Wade – 27.4
 Dwyane Wade – 27.2
 LeBron James – 27.1
 LeBron James – 27.1

Most total rebounds
 Udonis Haslem – 5,772
 Alonzo Mourning – 4,087
 Rony Seikaly – 4,544
 Dwyane Wade – 4,482
 Hassan Whiteside – 3,870Most rebounds in a game Rony Seikaly – 34Most assists in a game Tim Hardaway – 19Most blocks in a game Hassan Whiteside – 12Career triple doubles'''
 Jimmy Butler – 10
 LeBron James – 9
 Bam Adebayo – 5
 Dwyane Wade – 5
 Hassan Whiteside – 4
 Billy Owens – 1
 Goran Dragić – 1
 Kyle Lowry – 1
 Lamar Odom – 1
 Hassan Whiteside – 4
 Rory Sparrow – 1
 Shaquille O'Neal – 1
 Steve Smith – 1

References

records
National Basketball Association accomplishments and records by team